Soponya is a village in Fejér county, Hungary.

Gallery

External links

  in Hungarian
 Street map 
 Aerial photos

Populated places in Fejér County